The 2011 South Australian National Football League season was the 132nd season of the top-level Australian rules football competition in South Australia.

Premiership season

Round 1

Round 2

Round 3

Round 4

Ladder

Finals series

Qualifying and Elimination Finals

Semi-finals

Preliminary final

Grand Final

References

https://web.archive.org/web/20141112041227/http://australianfootball.com/seasons/season/SANFL/2011/basic
http://www.sanfl.com.au/files/_system/File/PDFs/2012/2011SANFLAR.pdf 

South Australian National Football League seasons
SANFL